Vitor Assan Paulo (born April 30, 1996) is a Brazilian singer, songwriter and musician. He is best known as the lead singer and guitar player of the Brazilian alternative metal band Quimere, which he co-founded in 2015.

Biography 
Assan is a direct descendant of the Lebanese, who fled the war in search of better living conditions in Brazil. Influenced by the Brazilian music scene and musicians like Kiko Loureiro, beginning the guitar studies at 12 years of age.

Vitor began his musical trajectory at age 13, playing in several garage bands. Joined the Dynastia band in 2013 where he played with his current bandmate Thiago Modesto. With the end of the band both founded Quimere, band that remains until today.

References

External links

 
 MusicBrainz

1996 births
Living people
People from São Paulo
Brazilian people of Portuguese descent
Brazilian people of Italian descent
Brazilian people of Lebanese descent
Brazilian heavy metal guitarists
Brazilian rock musicians
Musicians from São Paulo
Quimere members
21st-century guitarists